This is a list of members of the European Parliament for Spain in the 1994 to 1999 session, ordered by name. See 1994 European Parliament election in Spain for election results.

List

1994
Spain
list